DK Lacertae (Nova Lacertae 1950) was a nova, which lit up in the constellation Lacerta in 1950.   The nova was discovered by Charles Bertaud of the Paris Observatory on a photographic plate taken on 23 January 1950.   At the time of its discovery, it had an apparent magnitude of 6.1.  DK Lacertae reached peak magnitude 5.0, making it easily visible to the naked eye.

DK Lacertae's post-eruption light curve was remarkable for the large number of outbursts of a magnitude or more which occurred in the months after the main nova event.  Strope et al. (2010) reported that there were 14 of these "jitters" in the light curve, and they used this star as the prototype object for their type J light curve class. It took about 60 days for the nova to drop from peak brightness by 3 magnitudes, which makes DK Lacertae a "fast" nova.

X-ray emission has been detected from this system.

All novae are binary stars, with a "donor" star orbiting a white dwarf. The donor star is so close to the white dwarf that matter is transferred from the donor to an accretion disk surrounding the white dwarf.   In the case of DK Lacertae, Shara et al. (2018) estimate that the white dwarf has a mass of 1.03 and the donor star is transferring  to the accretion disk.  The orbital periods of nova are typically a few hours, but no photometric periodicity on that timescale has been found for DK Lac, suggesting that we are viewing the accretion disk nearly face-on.

References

External links
 https://web.archive.org/web/20070928040256/http://www.tsm.toyama.toyama.jp/curators/aroom/var/nova/1950.htm

Novae
Lacerta (constellation)
1950 in science
Lacertae, DK